Charles Christopher Mierow (1883–1961) was an American academic and classical scholar.

He had a Princeton Ph.D. in classical languages and literature, and was known as a translator. In years the 1923-1924 and 1925-1934 he was president of Colorado College. He was appointed professor of biography at Carleton College, a position he held from 1935 to 1951.

Works

Translations
The Origin And Deeds Of The Goths of Jordanes.
The letters of St. Jerome. Vol. 1: Letters 1–22, translated by Charles Christopher Mierow, introduction and notes by Thomas Comerford Lawler, 1963 (Ancient Christian Writers, 33) 
Charles Christopher Mierow, ed. The Deeds of Frederick Barbarossa. By Otto of Freising and his continuator, Rahewin; translated and annotated with an introduction by Charles Christopher Mierow with the collaboration of Richard Emery, reprinted from the 1956 edition  on AC

Others
Charles Christopher Mierow (1956). The Hallowed Flame. Principia Press of Illinois.
Charles Christopher Mierow (1959). Saint Jerome: The Sage of Bethlehem. Milwaukee, WI: Bruce Publishing Company.

Notes

External links
 
 
 

1883 births
1961 deaths
American classical scholars
Latin–English translators
20th-century American translators